Thuneri  is a village in Kozhikode district in the state of Kerala, India.

Demographics
 India census, Thuneri had a population of 21780 with 10151 males and 11629 females.

Educational Organizations
Eshwara Vilasam Upper Primary (EVUP) School is the main school near Thuneri. There are many lower primary and upper primary schools around Thuneri. It is situated near the KSEB office Thuneri.EVUP came to existence  in 1939 by R Govinda Kurup and Ammalu Amma. The school is now managed by the third generation of the family. There are 13 Lower primary schools, two Upper primary and One Higher school belongs to Thuneri Panchayth.

Temples and mosques
  Thuneri Sree Vettakkoru Makan Temple 
 Thueri Juma Masjid
 Salafi Masjid

Political Violence
DYFI worker C.K.Shibin, 19, was hacked to death on 22 January 2015, at Vellore, Thuneri, allegedly by IUML workers.
Following the murder, Thuneri witnessed a series of riots and looting with more than 50 Muslim houses being attacked and properties worth crores of rupees destroyed allegedly by [CPM] and later the court released the offenders of C.K. Shibin due to lack of evidence, however the CPM workers killed brutally one of the offenders, ASLAM , 21, and nothing happened in the same place.

Transportation
Thuneri village connects to other parts of India through Vatakara city on the west and Kuttiady town on the east.  National highway No.66 passes through Vatakara and the northern stretch connects to Mangalore, Goa and Mumbai.  The southern stretch connects to Cochin and Trivandrum. Frequent bus services are available to Thalassery, Vatakara and Thottilpalam through Kuttiady.  The eastern Highway  going through Kuttiady connects to Mananthavady, Mysore and Bangalore. The nearest airports are at Kannur and Kozhikode.  The nearest railway station is at Vatakara.

References

Villages in Kozhikode district
Vatakara area